Bethesda Christian School is a private K-12 Christian school located in Fort Worth, Texas. Bethesda Christian School started in 1980.

References

External links
 Bethesda Christian School website

Christian schools in Texas
Private high schools in Fort Worth, Texas
Private K-12 schools in Texas